LTCC may refer to:
 Lake Tahoe Community College
 Low temperature co-fired ceramic
 London Terminal Control Centre
 L-type calcium channel
 Longwall Top Coal Caving
 Diyarbakır Airport (LTCC)